Like the Deserts Miss the Rain is a compilation album by the British band Everything but the Girl, released in 2002. Some copies include a bonus disc featuring four additional songs. An accompanying DVD with the same title was also released the same year. The album's title derives from a lyric from their song "Missing", off 1994's Amplified Heart.

Track listing

DVD
Videos
 "Missing" (Todd Terry Remix)
 "Single"
 "The Only Living Boy in New York"
 "Temperamental"
 "Love Is Here Where I Live"
 "Five Fathoms"
 "Each and Every One"
 "Driving"
 "Walking Wounded"

Live
 "Before Today"
 "Temperamental"
 "Protection"

Demos
 "Frozen River"
 "Mirrorball"
 "Flipside"

Extras include: Photo gallery, interactive video mix of "Temperamental"

Charts

References

2002 greatest hits albums
Everything but the Girl compilation albums